Crown Park Suburbs (Porth Tywyn Suburbs AFC) are a Welsh football club from Llanelli in Carmarthenshire. They have played in the Welsh Football League reaching the top flight, Division One (Tier 2 of the Welsh Football Pyramid). They currently play in the Carmarthenshire League.

History
The club was formed in 1921 by local workmen in the Burry Port area and played its formative years in the Llanelly and District League. They have played at various locations in Burry Port including Wood Brook - Park Tywyn, to spells at the town's Glan y Mor Comprehensive School and Memorial Park. The club is now known as Crown Park Suburbs, having relocated in recent years to Crown Park in the Seaside area of Llanelli.

The club has also been known as Garden Suburbs F.C. and was also briefly known as Garden Suburbs Rangers in the 1990s.   Between the 1993–94 and 2003–04 seasons the club played in the Welsh Football League.

The 2020–21 Season would have been a historic season for the club celebrating its 100-year anniversary but celebrations were put on hold due to the coronavirus pandemic. In the 2021–22 season and there was a revised centenary book written about the club's history, including extracts from the previous 75-year anniversary book, written by Dai Bowen. This centenary book will focus on history, but more importantly, people's experiences and stories of the club. Three centenary matches were also played including one against a select Carmarthenshire League side.

Honours

 Welsh Football League Division Two - Runners-Up: 1997–98
 Welsh Football League Division Three - Runners-Up: 1994–95
 Carmarthenshire League Premier Division - Champions: (3) 1979–80; 1983–84; 1989–90
 Carmarthenshire League First Division - Champions: 1975–76
 Carmarthenshire Senior Cup - Winners (3): 1977–78; 1979–80; 1982–83
 Carmartenshire Challenge Cup - Winners: 1975–76
 Darch Cup - Winners (4):  1974–75; 1978–79; 1983–84; 1989–90
 West Wales Cup - Winners:  1984–85

Welsh Football League history

Notes

Welsh Cup
In the 2003–04 competition, the club reached the fourth round but the tie was awarded to Afan Lido as a walkover after they resigned from the league.

References

External links
Official club website

Football clubs in Wales
Sport in Carmarthenshire
1921 establishments in Wales
Association football clubs established in 1921
Carmarthenshire League clubs
Welsh Football League clubs
Sport in Llanelli